Aethriamanta aethra is a species of dragonfly in the family Libellulidae. It is native to Cambodia, Indonesia, Malaysia, Singapore, Thailand, and Vietnam. It lives in marshy habitat, such as swamps, mangroves, and ponds.

References

Libellulidae
Insects of Southeast Asia
Insects described in 1912